Babestation (labelled Babenation on the Sky EPG) is an adult chat television channel and programme block which has aired on television in the United Kingdom since 2002. Since 2015, Babestation has also had a complementary website that includes more options than those available on the TV channel. The television version was the first show of its kind in the UK allowing viewers to communicate live with female presenters via a premium-rate telephone number or text messaging. It is broadcast daily, and since 2006 has had a dedicated channel on Sky.  Its sister stations and websites are more hardcore in nature but the main programme shown on TV is also streamed on the Internet via the babestation.com website.

History
Babestation began in late 2002, as a post-watershed two-hour programme (11 pm – 1 am) on computer game channel Game Network UK. Babestation featured two women taking calls (unheard by the TV audience) whilst the rest of the screen was filled by viewers' text messages and one presenter, who improvised and reacted to the messages. On some occasions the three women on screen would take turns as presenter.

The programme proved profitable to the channel and Babestations makers. In time, Babestation was given bigger time-slots, becoming a three- and then four-hour-long show (11 pm – 3 am), increasing the number of presenters to four or five per night, and improving the technology (the director could now put women on full screen, having only been able to show them on one-sixth of it before, and hand-held cameras were introduced, replacing the poorer-quality static remote-controlled ones that were originally used). Babestation was also sometimes broadcast on the Italian feed of Game Network.

This, along with Game Network's waning commitment to video gaming programmes (Psychic Interactive was also given a large amount of airtime), caused Game Network to cease to exist in the UK. On 20 February 2006, the channel's name changed to Babestation, and on 28 February the channel was moved by Sky to the new "Adult" section of channels. It is also available on Free-to-air channels under the Adult Section.

Babestation is now owned and operated by Cellcast PLC, a company which was co-founded by Andrew Wilson and Bertrand Folliet in 2002.

In 2022 Babestation carried the broadcast of the funeral of Queen Elizabeth II, leaving some viewers confused.

A new type of show
Babestation was a unique style of TV programme in Britain. Despite not being popular, and having low production values, Babestation produced many clones that can all be seen as originating from its format.

These programmes all differ slightly in format and explicitness – Babestation generally does not show genitals or sex toys, or contain very strong language; since 2004 camera phone technology has been used to allow viewers to send in pictures of themselves; and the show has always featured adverts for similar services in its commercial breaks. But the idea is the same – live, simulated sex interspersed with unscripted conversation, advertising a premium rate number to phone the women, which makes it a profitable business.

Charlie Brooker of The Guardian accused both presenters and viewers of being "thick" and referred to viewers "begging them to blow kisses and jiggle about a bit".

David Nugus author of a privately published study into TV/phone sex channels (Spring 2013), conducted many interviews with the presenters. He found them to be articulate with considerable personality, a necessity for the success of such channels. 

Masti Chat

Masti Chat was a daily program on Babestation which allowed viewers to connect with British Asian women. The name is derived from the Hindi word मस्ती , meaning "fun". The program aired in a pre-watershed slot from 1pm until 9pm every day. A night show with more raunchy content was broadcast on Babestation 2 every so often. Masti Chat was axed in early 2014 and many of the women left. Some of the women remain on Babestation Daytime.

Dirty Wives

Dirty Wives was a show on the Sky version of Babestation 2 that was on once or twice a week in the night hours. The programme featured mature women (40+). The show no longer airs on TV or online.

Sister programmesBabecast (a.k.a. BabeCast XXX) was broadcast since 2003 on Friendly TV, and is owned by the same company as Babestation: it is sometimes filmed in the same studio, and presenters rotate between the two programmes. Friendly TV was originally in the 100–200 channel numbers on Sky, but on 28 February 2006 it moved to ch. 908 (now 907), in the Adult section of channels (like Babestation). This channel has been shut down and merged with Babestation.Babestation 2 was broadcast on ch. 909, Get Lucky TV, initially a phone-in quiz/gambling channel, although the channel's name now carries the more sexual meaning of "get lucky" because of its content. Babestation 2 features one or two Babestation presenters; now, instead of dividing up the screen of Babestation, its makers can put women on the extra channel. That channel has since been renamed Babestation Blue.Lads Lounge (ch. 906) was a daytime format of Babestation that aired during the pre-watershed slot of 5:30 am to 9:00 pm. The program has since been renamed Babestation Daytime and Babestation Daytime Xtra, both of which continue to air to this day.Babestation Xtreme is a subscription website/TV channel (freeview 174) that features hard core British porn. The program changed its name to Babestation X in 2013, but now goes by the name BSX the current name launched in 2014. The channel airs from 11:00pm to 4:45am every night, with 2 free-views as well.Babestation Unleashed''''' is an online-only channel featuring more raunchy content (including sex toys and more strong profanity) than the normal program can. Even though it is online only, the BSX channel airs programs from Unleashed sometimes. It was originally known as Sexstation.

See also
 Game Network
 Friendly TV
 List of adult television channels

References

External links
 
 

British pornographic television shows
Adult chat (television)
Cellcast
Nudity in television
Television pornography